U.S. Route 1 (US 1) in Washington, D.C., passes through from Arlington, Virginia, to Mount Rainier, Maryland, predominantly along surface streets. However, it forms a few overlaps with other routes.

Route description

Northbound US 1 and Interstate 395 (I-395) enter the District of Columbia from Virginia on the 14th Street bridges. US 1 traffic exits I-395 from the left to 14th Street, Southwest. After 14th Street crosses the National Mall, US 1 turns right onto Constitution Avenue. It then turns left onto 6th Street, Northwest, and then right onto Rhode Island Avenue. US 1 continues on Rhode Island Avenue through Northeast and into Maryland.

Southbound US 1 enters the District of Columbia from Maryland on Rhode Island Avenue. US 1 turns left onto 6th Street, NW, then right onto L Street, NW, and then left onto 9th Street, NW. It enters the Ninth Street Tunnel and joins I-395, which it follows into Virginia.

Northbound US 1 is concurrent with eastbound US 50 along Constitution Avenue from 14th Street to 6th Street, NW, and along 6th Street from Constitution Avenue to New York Avenue, NW. Southbound US 1 is concurrent with westbound US 50 along L Street between 6th and 9th streets, NW, and along 9th Street from L Street to Constitution Avenue. Both northbound and southbound US 1 have concurrencies with I-395.

History
When originally designated in 1926, US 1 entered Washington DC on Bladensburg Road. The old route then continued on Maryland Avenue and turned south on 1st Street, where it then turns left into the U.S. Capitol grounds. US 1 went around the Capitol, making its way to Pennsylvania Avenue. The route continues on Pennsylvania Avenue to 14th Street where it turns south. US 1 then left Washington DC on 14th Street as it does today. By 1946, US 1 entered from the north using Rhode Island Avenue continuing all the way to 14th Street (via Vermont Avenue). It was shifted to its current alignment by 1967.

Major intersections
The entire route is in the District of Columbia.

Related routes
US 1 Alternate leaves US 1 at New York Avenue, following US 50 east, and rejoins the highway in Hyattsville, Maryland.

References

External links

01
 1 District of Columbia